Margaret Patricia O'Sullivan Pepe (born June 24, 1961) is an Irish biostatistician specializing in the evaluation of tests and biomarkers for disease screening. She is a professor of biostatistics at the University of Washington School of Public Health and a researcher at the Fred Hutchinson Cancer Research Center.

Life 
Pepe was born June 24, 1961 in Cork, Ireland to Seamus O'Sullivan. She attended Mount Mercy College, Cork. She completed a B.Sc. in mathematics science at the University College Cork in 1981. Pepe earned a M.S. in statistics in 1984 and a Ph.D. in biostatistics at the University of Washington School of Public Health in 1986. Her dissertation was titled, A new class of statistics for the two-sample survival analysis problem. Thomas R. Fleming was her doctoral advisor.

In 1997, she won the Mortimer Spiegelman Award.

Pepe is a professor of biostatistics at the University of Washington School of Public Health. She is a researcher at the Fred Hutchinson Cancer Research Center.

Selected works

References 

Living people
1961 births
21st-century American mathematicians
21st-century women mathematicians
American women statisticians
Biostatisticians
American medical researchers
Women medical researchers
21st-century American women scientists
21st-century American biologists
American women biologists
Alumni of University College Cork
University of Washington School of Public Health alumni
University of Washington faculty
Irish emigrants to the United States
21st-century Irish women scientists
21st-century Irish mathematicians
Irish statisticians
Expatriate academics in the United States
People from Cork (city)